Pine Forge is an unincorporated community in Douglass Township in Berks County, Pennsylvania, United States. Pine Forge is located along Manatawny Drive to the north of the Manatawny Creek and southwest of Boyertown.

References

Unincorporated communities in Berks County, Pennsylvania
Unincorporated communities in Pennsylvania